The Ruth I. Michler Memorial Prize is an annual prize in mathematics, awarded by the Association for Women in Mathematics to honor outstanding research by a female mathematician who has recently earned tenure. The prize funds the winner to spend a semester as a visiting faculty member at Cornell University, working with the faculty there and presenting a distinguished lecture on their research. It is named after Ruth I. Michler (1967–2000), a German-American mathematician born at Cornell, who died young in a construction accident.

The award was first offered in 2007. Its winners and their lectures have included:
Rebecca Goldin (2007), "The Geometry of Polygons"
Irina Mitrea (2008), "Boundary-Value Problems for Higher-Order Elliptic Operators"
Maria Gordina (2009), "Lie's Third Theorem in Infinite Dimensions"
Patricia Hersh (2010), "Regular CS Complexes, Total Positivity and Bruhat Order"
Anna Mazzucato (2011), "The Analysis of Incompressible Fluids at High Reynolds Numbers"
Ling Long (2012), "Atkin and Swinnerton-Dyer Congruences"
Megumi Harada (2013), "Newton-Okounkov bodies and integrable systems"
Sema Salur (2014), "Manifolds with G2 structure and beyond"
Malabika Pramanik (2015), "Needles, Bushes, Hairbrushes, and Polynomials"
Pallavi Dani (2016), "Large-scale geometry of right-angled Coxeter groups"
Julia Gordon (2017), "Wilkie's theorem and (ineffective) uniform bounds"
Julie Bergner (2018), "2-Segal structures and the Waldhausen S-construction"
Anna Skripka (2019), "Untangling noncommutativity with operator integrals"
Shabnam Akhtari (2021), "Representation of integers by binary forms"
Emily E. Witt (2022), "Local cohomology:  An algebraic tool capturing geometric data"

See also

 List of awards honoring women
 List of mathematics awards

References

Awards established in 2017
Awards and prizes of the Association for Women in Mathematics
2017 establishments in New York (state)
Cornell University
Awards honoring women